Daguerrotype (also known as The Woman in the Silver Plate; ;  or ) is a 2016 romantic horror film written and directed by Kiyoshi Kurosawa. It stars Tahar Rahim, Constance Rousseau, Olivier Gourmet, Mathieu Amalric, and Malik Zidi.

Plot
Stéphane, a renowned fashion photographer, lives in seclusion in a dilapidated house in the Paris suburbs, together with his daughter and muse Marie. Stéphane is obsessed with his wife's unexpected death and creates her daguerreotypes every day, using his daughter as a photomodel. In order for him to do so, Marie has to remain immobile for a long time, wearing an old-fashioned blue dress.

Jean, a young Parisian and the new assistant of Stéphane, falls in love with Marie. He is disturbed by the long photo sessions and, together with Marie, tries to figure out how to free Stéphane from his obsession. Jean decides to convince Stéphane to sell his real estate. The money received for the sale may be used to start a life elsewhere—both for Jean who wants to live with Marie and for the photographer who can recreate his photography studio. But things do not go as planned.

Cast
 Tahar Rahim as Jean
 Constance Rousseau as Marie
 Olivier Gourmet as Stephane
 Mathieu Amalric as Vincent
 Malik Zidi as Thomas
 Valerie Sibilia as Denise
 Jacques Collard as Louis

Release
The film had its world premiere in the Platform section at the 2016 Toronto International Film Festival on 11 September 2016. It was released in Japan on 15 October 2016, and in France on 8 March 2017. It also screened at the 21st Busan International Film Festival, the 29th Tokyo International Film Festival, the 2017 Nippon Connection, and the 2017 Japan Cuts.

Reception
On review aggregator website Rotten Tomatoes, the film holds an approval rating of 46% based on 13 reviews, and an average rating of 5.88/10.

Boyd van Hoeij of The Hollywood Reporter gave the film a favorable review, saying, "A double-take scene in an empty church is an especially strong moment because of Rahim's (and Kurosawa's) tacit understanding of understatement." Meanwhile, Sam Fragoso of TheWrap gave the film an unfavorable review, describing it as "two or three movies haphazardly wrapped into one." Andrew Barker of Variety called it "Heavy on moody atmospherics yet fundamentally inert." Keith Uhlich of Slant Magazine stated that it is reminiscent of William Dieterle's 1948 romantic fantasy film, Portrait of Jennie.

References

External links
  
 
 

2016 films
2010s romance films
2016 horror films
Romantic horror films
Japanese romance films
Japanese horror films
Japanese ghost films
French romance films
French ghost films
French horror films
2010s French-language films
Films directed by Kiyoshi Kurosawa
Films about photographers
2010s French films
2010s Japanese films